is a Japanese private university in Ryūgasaki, Ibaraki. It was founded in 1965. The school has secondary campuses in Matsudo, Chiba and also in Kashiwa, Chiba.

See also
Ryutsu Keizai University F.C., affiliated football club.
List of universities in Japan

External links

  

Private universities and colleges in Japan
Universities and colleges in Ibaraki Prefecture
Educational institutions established in 1965
Ryūgasaki, Ibaraki
1965 establishments in Japan